The 2000 NCAA Division I men's ice hockey tournament involved 12 schools playing in single-elimination play to determine the national champion of men's  NCAA Division I college ice hockey.

The final event was played at Providence Civic Center, Providence, Rhode Island. North Dakota, coached by Dean Blais, defeated Boston College, coached by Jerry York, by a 4-2 score on April 8. BC, seeking its first NCAA title since 1949, had a 2-1 lead entering the final period of play, but the Fighting Sioux responded with three goals in the final 20 minutes of play, with two of those goals scored by Lee Goren. Goren tied the game, assisted on Jason Ulmer's game-winning goal, and then scored into an empty Eagles net in the last minute of play to ice the victory. It marked North Dakota's seventh national title overall and second since 1997, and was also the third time in three years that BC came up short in the Frozen Four.

North Dakota had advanced to the title game by blanking Maine, 2-0, in the early semifinal on April 6, while BC came from behind to top St. Lawrence, 4-2, in the late semifinal that evening.

Qualifying teams
The at-large bids and seeding for each team in the tournament were announced after the conference tournaments concluded on March 18, 2000. Hockey East had four teams receive a berth in the tournament, Western Collegiate Hockey Association (WCHA) had three teams receive a berth in the tournament, Central Collegiate Hockey Association (CCHA) and the ECAC each had two berths, while College Hockey America (CHA) received its first entry into the tournament.

Number in parentheses denotes overall seed in the tournament.

Game locations
 East Regional – Pepsi Arena, Albany, New York
 West Regional – Mariucci Arena, Minneapolis, Minnesota
 Frozen Four – Providence Civic Center, Providence, Rhode Island

Bracket

Regionals

Frozen Four

Note: * denotes overtime period(s)

Regional Quarterfinals

West Regional

(3) New Hampshire vs. (6) Niagara

(4) Boston College vs. (5) Michigan State

East Regional

(3) Boston University vs. (6) St. Cloud State

(4) Colgate vs. (5) Michigan

Regional semifinals

West Regional

(1) Wisconsin vs. (4) Boston College

(2) North Dakota vs. (6) Niagara

East Regional

(1) Maine vs. (5) Michigan

(2) St. Lawrence vs. (3) Boston University

Frozen Four

National semifinal

(E2) St. Lawrence vs. (W4) Boston College

(E1) Maine vs. (W2) North Dakota

National Championship

(W2) North Dakota vs. (W4) Boston College

All-Tournament team
G: Karl Goehring (North Dakota)
D: Mike Commodore (North Dakota)
D: Mike Mottau (Boston College)
F: Jeff Farkas (Boston College)
F: Lee Goren* (North Dakota)
F: Bryan Lundbohm (North Dakota)
* Most Outstanding Player(s)

Record by conference

References

Tournament
NCAA Division I men's ice hockey tournament
NCAA Men's Division Ice Hockey Tournament
NCAA Men's Division Ice Hockey Tournament
NCAA Men's Division Ice Hockey Tournament
NCAA Men's Division Ice Hockey Tournament
NCAA Men's Division Ice Hockey Tournament
2000s in Minneapolis
Ice hockey competitions in Minneapolis
Ice hockey competitions in Albany, New York
Ice hockey competitions in Providence, Rhode Island